is the second single from Japanese idol group Hinatazaka46. It was released on July 17, 2019, through Sony Music Entertainment Japan. The title track features Nao Kosaka as center. The title track was nominated for 61st Japan Record Awards in the Grand Prix category.

Release 
This single was released in 4 versions. Type-A, Type-B, Type-C and a regular edition. The music video, produced by Hayato Andō, was shot inside an empty swimming pool.

Track listing 
All lyrics written by Yasushi Akimoto.

Type-A

Type-B

Type-C

Regular Edition

Awards 
The following table lists some of the major awards received by the group.

Participating members

"Do Re Mi Sol La Si Do" 
Center: Nao Kosaka

 1st row: Kyōko Saitō, Akari Nibu, Nao Kosaka, Hina Kawata, Shiho Katō
 2nd row: Manamo Miyata, Mirei Sasaki, Miku Kanemura, Mei Higashimura, Ayaka Takamoto, Miho Watanabe
 3rd row: Kumi Sasaki, Mao Iguchi, Sarina Ushio, Suzuka Tomita, Hinano Kamimura, Mana Takase, Hiyori Hamagishi, Konoka Matsuda

"Kitsune" 
Mao Iguchi, Sarina Ushio, Shiho Katō, Kyōko Saitō, Kumi Sasaki, Mirei Sasaki, Mana Takase, Ayaka Takamoto, Mei Higashimura, Miku Kanemura, Hina Kawata, Nao Kosaka, Suzuka Tomita, Akari Nibu, Hiyori Hamagishi, Konoka Matsuda, Manamo Miyata, Miho Watanabe, Hinano Kamimura

"My God" 
Mei Higashimura, Miku Kanemura, Hina Kawata, Akari Nibu

"Cage" 
Mei Higashimura, Miku Kanemura, Hina Kawata, Akari Nibu

"Yasashisa ga Jyama o Suru" 
Center: Kumi Sasaki

Mao Iguchi, Sarina Ushio, Shiho Katō, Kyōko Saitō, Kumi Sasaki, Mirei Sasaki, Mana Takase, Ayaka Takamoto, Mei Higashimura

"Dash&Rush" 
Center: Miku Kanemura

Miku Kanemura, Hina Kawata, Nao Kosaka, Suzuka Tomita, Akari Nibu, Hiyori Hamagishi, Konoka Matsuda, Manamo Miyata, Miho Watanabe, Hinano Kamimura

Charts

Weekly charts

Year-end charts

References 

2019 singles
Hinatazaka46 songs
2019 songs
Songs with lyrics by Yasushi Akimoto
Sony Music Entertainment Japan singles
Oricon Weekly number-one singles
Billboard Japan Hot 100 number-one singles